Khawhai is a census town in Champhai district in the Indian state of Mizoram.

Geography
It has an average elevation of 1369 metres (4491 feet).

Demographics
 India census, Khawhai had a population of 2408. Males constitute 51% of the population and females 49%. Khawhai has an average literacy rate of 78%, higher than the national average of 59.5%: male literacy is 79%, and female literacy is 78%. In Khawhai, 17% of the population is under 6 years of age.

References

Champhai
Cities and towns in Champhai district